Nadie sabe para quién trabaja is a 2017 Colombian-Peruvian black comedy film directed by Harold Trompetero and written by Alejandro Matallana. It stars Robinson Díaz, Jessica Cediel, Adolfo Aguilar, Hernán Méndez Alonso, Francisco Bolívar, Claudio Cataño, Primo Rojas, Germán Quintero, Diego Camargo and Diego Mateus.

Synopsis 
Simón is a Peruvian who lives in Bogotá and who does not have the right to the inheritance of his uncle, who, already dead, did not leave a will. Arturo will ally with Antonia, an accountant with whom he shares an office, to claim the inheritance by applying the most unexpected techniques, tactics and tricks.

Cast 
The actors participating in this film are:

 Robinson Díaz as Arturo Pataquiva
 Jéssica Cediel as Antonia Ramirez
 Adolfo Aguilar as Simón Quispe
 Francisco Bolívar as Gustavo Rodríguez
 Diego Camargo as The insurer
 Claudio Cataño as Diego Ángel
 Hernán Méndez as Bernardo Ángel
 Cousin Rojas as Robledo

Release 
It premiered on December 25, 2017 in Colombian theaters, and on February 22, 2018 in Peruvian theaters.

References

External links 

 

2017 films
2017 black comedy films
Colombian black comedy films
Peruvian black comedy films
Big Bang Films films
2010s Spanish-language films
2010s Peruvian films
Films set in Bogotá
2010s Colombian films